Greek homosexuality may refer to:
Homosexuality in ancient Greece
Greek Homosexuality (book)
Homosexuality in modern Greece (see Category:LGBT in Greece)